Santa Apollonia is a church in Pisa, Italy.

Once called San Pietro a Schia, this church is known from documents from 1116, and a reconstruction in 1277. In 1777, the Pisan architect Mattia Tarocchi reconstructed the church in Baroque style. The interior houses  the altar and stucco and mural decorations by Tarocchi, and  paintings by Aurelio Lomi,  Pandolfo Titi,  and the 19th-century painter Giuseppe Bacchini.

Sources

Apollonia
Apollonia
Roman Catholic churches completed in 1777
18th-century Roman Catholic church buildings in Italy